Pasteur Medal may refer to:
 Pasteur Medal (Illinoisan)
 Pasteur Medal (Swedish)
 UNESCO/Institut Pasteur Medal, a joint award